The Lady in Black is a 1951 West German crime film directed by Erich Engels and starring Paul Hartmann, Mady Rahl and Rudolf Prack. It was shot at the Bavaria Studios in Munich. The film's sets were designed by the art director Max Mellin.

Cast
 Paul Hartmann as Frederik Royce
 Mady Rahl as Bianca Monnier
 Rudolf Prack as Nils Corbett
 Harald Paulsen as 'Fürst' Balbanoff
 Inge Egger as Ann
 Franz Schafheitlin as Chefinspektor Marshall
 Ernst Fritz Fürbringer as Bankier Petterson
 Josefin Kipper as Carla Royce
 Rolf von Nauckhoff as Henry Richards
 Gertrud Wolle as Frau Dalström
 Toni Treutler as Frau Milovic
 Liesl Karlstadt as Frau Bogota
 Rudolf Schündler as Polizeiinspektor Polter
 Ludwig Schmidseder as Herr Bogota
 Ulrich Folkmar as Polizeiinspektor Bonden
 Petra Unkel

References

Bibliography 
 Hans-Michael Bock and Tim Bergfelder. The Concise Cinegraph: An Encyclopedia of German Cinema. Berghahn Books.

External links 
 

1951 films
1951 crime films
German crime films
West German films
1950s German-language films
Films shot at Bavaria Studios
Films directed by Erich Engels
German black-and-white films
1950s German films